In molecular biology, members of the ArgJ protein family are bifunctional protein that catalyses the first and fifth steps in arginine biosynthesis. The structure has been determined for glutamate N-acetyltransferase 2 (ornithine acetyltransferase), an ArgJ-like protein from Streptomyces clavuligerus.

References

Protein families